Jama is a common Somali male name. The name is usually given to boys born on the blessed Islamic day of Friday (jumu’ah).     

Typically, the name is found in the Northern regions of Greater Somalia.

Given name
 Jama Ali Jama, Somali politician in the state of Puntland
 Jama Ali Korshel, Major General and former Head of the Somali Police Force
 Jama Garad Ali, traditional Dhulbahante clan chief
 Jama Musse Jama, Somali ethnomathematician and author

Surname
 Abdirahman Jama Barre, Somali politician; former Foreign Minister and Finance Minister of Somalia
 Ahmed Sheikh Jama, Somali academician, writer, poet and politician
 Asha Jama, Somali-Canadian social activist, and former TV reporter and journalist
 Farah Ali Jama, former Puntland Minister of Finance
 Farah Mohamed Jama Awl, Somali writer
 Hibaq Jama, Somali-British politician; Labour Party Ward Councillor representing Lawrence Hill neighbourhood in Bristol
 Kayse Jama, Somali-American politician
 Maya Jama, Somali-Swedish broadcast journalist and British TV/Radio presenter.
 Mohammed Ahamed Jama, Norwegian-Somali footballer; plays for Tromsdalen UIL
 Nathif Jama Adam, Somali banker, writer and politician
 Osman Jama Ali, Somali politician and former Prime Minister of Somalia
 Salah Hassan Jama, former chief of the Somali Army
 Salah Jama, the Deputy Prime Minister of the Federal Government of Somalia
 Shire Jama Ahmed, Somali linguist; devised Latin script for transcribing the Somali language

Somali masculine given names
Somali given names